Donald in Mathmagic Land is a 1959 American animated-live-action featurette produced by Walt Disney Productions and featuring Donald Duck. The short was directed by Hamilton Luske (with Wolfgang Reitherman, Les Clark, and Joshua Meador as sequence directors) and was released on June 26, 1959. It was nominated for an Academy Award for Best Documentary (Short Subject) at the 32nd Academy Awards, and became a widely viewed educational film in American schools of the 1960s and beyond.

Plot

1: Very Strange
The film begins with Donald Duck, holding a hunting rifle, passing through a doorway to find that he has entered Mathmagic Land. This "mighty strange" fantasy land contains trees with square roots, a stream flowing with numbers, and a walking pencil that plays tic-tac-toe. A geometric bird recites (almost perfectly) the first 15 digits of pi. Donald soon hears the voice of the unseen "True Spirit of Adventure" (Paul Frees), who will guide him on his journey through "the wonderland of mathematics".

2: The Time Of Pythagoras
Donald is initially not interested in exploring Mathmagic Land, believing that math is just for "eggheads". When "Mr. Spirit" suggests a connection between math and music, though, Donald is intrigued. First, Donald discovers the relationships between octaves and string length which develop the musical scale of today. Next, Donald finds himself in ancient Greece, where Pythagoras and his contemporaries are discovering these same relationships. Pythagoras (on the harp), a flute player, and a double bass player hold a "jam session" which Donald joins after a few moments using a vase as a bongo drum. Pythagoras' mathematical discoveries are, as the Spirit explains, the basis of today's music, and that music would not exist without "eggheads". The segment ends with a sequence of live action musicians playing both jazz and classical music and Pythagoras' pals fading away.

3: The Golden Rectangle
After shaking hands with Pythagoras, who then vanishes, Donald finds on his hand a pentagram, the symbol of the secret Pythagorean society. The Spirit then shows Donald how the mysterious golden section appears in the pentagram. Next, the pentagram is shown to contain the pattern for constructing golden rectangles many times over. According to the Spirit, the golden rectangle has influenced both ancient and modern cultures in many ways. Donald then learns how the golden rectangle appears in many ancient buildings, such as the Parthenon and the Notre Dame cathedral. Paintings such as the Mona Lisa and various sculptures such as the Venus de Milo contain several golden rectangles. The use of the golden rectangle is found in modern architecture, such as the United Nations building in New York City. Modern painters have also rediscovered the magic of the golden rectangles.

4: Mathematical Forms In Nature
The Spirit shows Donald how the golden rectangle and pentagram are related to the human body and nature, respectively.  The human body contains the "ideal proportions" of the golden section; Donald, overinterpreting the Spirit's advice, tries to make his own body fit such a proportion, but his efforts are to no avail; he ends up "all pent up in a pentagon". The pentagram and pentagon are then shown to be found in many flowers and animals, such as the petunia, the star jasmine, the starfish, the waxflower, and with the help of the inside of a nautilus shell, the Spirit explains that the magic proportions of the golden section are often found in the spirals of nature's designs, quoting Pythagoras: "Everything is arranged according to number and mathematical shape".

5: Mathematics in Games
Donald then learns that mathematics applies not only to nature, architecture, and music, but also to games that are played on geometrical surfaces, including chess, baseball, American football, basketball, hopscotch, and three-cushion billiard. Donald even volunteers the game Tiddlywinks, but the Spirit does not pursue this option. Themes of Lewis Carroll's 1871 novel Through the Looking-Glass are scattered throughout the chess scene; Carroll himself was both a writer and a mathematician. The extended billiards scene, which features a non-speaking live actor, shows the calculations involved in the game's "diamond system", and Donald finally learns how to do the calculations, though he ends up making it tough for himself, spectacularly hitting ten cushions in a single shot nonetheless.

6: Mathematical Thinking
The Spirit then asks Donald to play a mental game, but he finds Donald's mind to be too cluttered with "Antiquated Ideas", "Bungling", "False Concepts", "Superstitions", and "Confusion".  After some mental house-cleaning, Donald plays with a circle and a triangle in his mind, he spins them to make them respectively into a sphere and a cone, and then he discovers useful inventions such as the wheel, train, magnifying glass, drill, spring, propeller, and telescope. Donald then discovers that pentagrams can be drawn inside each other indefinitely. Therefore, numbers provide an avenue to consider the infinite. The Spirit states that scientific knowledge and technological advances are unlimited, and the key to unlocking the doors of the future is mathematics. By the end of the film, Donald understands and appreciates the value of mathematics. The film closes with a quotation from Galileo Galilei: "Mathematics is the alphabet with which God has written the universe".

Cast
 Clarence Nash as Donald Duck (voice)
 Paul Frees as The True Spirit of Adventure / Narrator (voice), and the Pi creature (voice)
 June Foray as the Chess Queen (voice)
 Daws Butler as the Chess King (voice)
 Roman Yanez as The Billiards Player

Production
The film was directed by Hamilton Luske. Contributors included Disney artists John Hench and Art Riley, voice talent Paul Frees, and scientific expert Heinz Haber, who had worked on the Disney space shows. It was released on a bill with Darby O'Gill and the Little People. In 1959, it was nominated for an Academy Award for (Best Documentary – Short Subjects). In 1961, two years after its release, it was shown as part of the first program of Walt Disney's Wonderful World of Color with an introduction by Ludwig Von Drake.

The film was made available to schools and became one of the most popular educational films ever made by Disney. As Walt Disney himself explained, "The cartoon is a good medium to stimulate interest. We have recently explained mathematics in a film and in that way excited public interest in this very important subject."

Releases
1959 – theatrical release
1961 – Walt Disney's Wonderful World of Color, episode #8.1: "An Adventure in Color/Mathmagicland" (TV)

Home media
The short was released on November 11, 2008 on Walt Disney Treasures: The Chronological Donald, Volume Four: 1951-1961.

Additional releases include:
1988 – Walt Disney Mini Classics: Donald in Mathmagic Land (VHS)
2007 – Donald in Mathmagic Land (DVD exclusive to the Disney Movie Club)
2009 – Donald in Mathmagic Land (DVD)

In other media
 A comic book adaptation was made, scripted by Don R. Christensen, pencilled by Tony Strobl, and inked by Steve Steere. However, this version differs in some ways from the original film version, providing a better context for Donald's excursion into Mathmagic Land.
 The House of Mouse episode "Gone Goofy" features an advertisement for Mathmagic Land at the end.

References

External links

 
 
 
 Donald in Mathmagic Land at Disney.com

1950s educational films
1959 animated films
1959 short films
1950s Disney animated short films
Disney educational films
Donald Duck short films
1950s English-language films
Short films with live action and animation
Films scored by Buddy Baker (composer)
Films set in ancient Greece
Films set in Athens
Animated films set in New York City
Animated films set in Paris
Films about mathematics
Animated films about music and musicians
Films adapted into comics
Animated films based on Alice in Wonderland
Films directed by Les Clark
Films directed by Hamilton Luske
Films directed by Joshua Meador
Short films directed by Wolfgang Reitherman
Films produced by Walt Disney
Cultural depictions of Pythagoras
Animated films about birds
Films about ducks
American animated featurettes
1950s American films